The Right to Organise and Collective Bargaining Convention (1949) No 98 is  an International Labour Organization Convention. It is one of eight ILO fundamental conventions.

Its counterpart on the general principle of freedom of association is the Freedom of Association and Protection of the Right to Organise Convention (1949) No 87.

Content
The Preamble of Convention 98 notes its adoption on July 1, 1949. After this the Convention covers, first, the rights of union members to organise independently, without interference by employers in article 1 to 3. Second, articles 4 to 6 require the positive creation of rights to collective bargaining, and that each member state's law promotes it.

Rights to organise
Article 1 states that workers must be protected against discrimination for joining a union, particularly conditions of employers to not join a union, dismissal or any other prejudice for having union membership or engaging in union activities. Article 2 requires that both workers and employers' organisations (i.e. trade unions and business confederations) should not be interfered in their own establishment, functioning or administration. Article 2(2) prohibits, in particular, unions being dominated by employers through "financial or other means" (such as a union being given funding by an employer, or the employer influencing who the officials are). Article 3 requires each ILO member give effect to articles 1 and 2 through appropriate machinery, such as a government watchdog.

Rights to collective bargaining
Article 4 goes on to collective bargaining. It requires that the law promotes "the full development and utilisation of machinery for voluntary negotiation" between worker organisations and employer groups to regulation employment "by means of collective agreements." Article 5 states that national law can provide different laws for the police and armed forces, and the Convention does not affect laws that existed when an ILO member ratifies the Convention. Article 6 further gives an exemption for "the position of public servants engaged in the administration of the State".

Administrative provisions
Article 7 says ratifications should be communicated to the ILO Director General. Article 8 says the Convention is only binding on those who have ratified it, although the 1998 Declaration means that this is no longer entirely true: the Convention is binding as a fact of membership in the ILO. Articles 9 and 10 deal with specific territories where the Convention may be applied or modified. Article 11 concerns denunciation of the Convention, although again, because of the 1998 Declaration, it is no longer possible for an ILO member to profess they are not bound by the Convention: it is an essential principle of international law. Article 12 states the Director General shall keep all members notified of which countries have adhered to the Conventions. Article 13 states this shall be communicated to the United Nations. Article 14 states the ILO Governing Body shall produce reports on the working of the Convention. Article 15 deals with revisions to the Convention (none have taken place yet), and article 16 states that the English and French versions are equally authoritative.

Ratifications

The following countries have ratified ILO Convention 98:

See also

Freedom of association
Freedom of assembly

References

External links
 Text of the Convention 
 ratifications

Freedom of association
International Labour Organization conventions
Treaties concluded in 1949
Treaties entered into force in 1951
Treaties of the People's Socialist Republic of Albania
Treaties of Algeria
Treaties of the People's Republic of Angola
Treaties of Antigua and Barbuda
Treaties of Argentina
Treaties of Armenia
Treaties of Australia
Treaties of Austria
Treaties of Azerbaijan
Treaties of the Bahamas
Treaties of Bangladesh
Treaties of Barbados
Treaties of the Byelorussian Soviet Socialist Republic
Treaties of Belgium
Treaties of Belize
Treaties of the Republic of Dahomey
Treaties of Bolivia
Treaties of Bosnia and Herzegovina
Treaties of Botswana
Treaties of the Second Brazilian Republic
Treaties of the People's Republic of Bulgaria
Treaties of Burkina Faso
Treaties of Burundi
Treaties of Cambodia
Treaties of Cameroon
Treaties of Cape Verde
Treaties of the Central African Republic
Treaties of Chad
Treaties of Chile
Treaties of Colombia
Treaties of the Comoros
Treaties of the Democratic Republic of the Congo (1964–1971)
Treaties of the Republic of the Congo
Treaties of Costa Rica
Treaties of Ivory Coast
Treaties of Croatia
Treaties of Cuba
Treaties of Cyprus
Treaties of the Czech Republic
Treaties of Czechoslovakia
Treaties of Denmark
Treaties of Djibouti
Treaties of Dominica
Treaties of the Dominican Republic
Treaties of East Timor
Treaties of Ecuador
Treaties of the Republic of Egypt (1953–1958)
Treaties of El Salvador
Treaties of Equatorial Guinea
Treaties of Eritrea
Treaties of Estonia
Treaties of the Ethiopian Empire
Treaties of Fiji
Treaties of Finland
Treaties of the French Fourth Republic
Treaties of Gabon
Treaties of the Gambia
Treaties of Georgia (country)
Treaties of West Germany
Treaties of Ghana
Treaties of the Kingdom of Greece
Treaties of Grenada
Treaties of Guatemala
Treaties of Guinea
Treaties of Guinea-Bissau
Treaties of Haiti
Treaties of Honduras
Treaties of the Hungarian People's Republic
Treaties of Iceland
Treaties of Indonesia
Treaties of the Iraqi Republic (1958–1968)
Treaties of Ireland
Treaties of Israel
Treaties of Italy
Treaties of Jamaica
Treaties of Japan
Treaties of Jordan
Treaties of Kazakhstan
Treaties of Kenya
Treaties of Kiribati
Treaties of Kuwait
Treaties of Kyrgyzstan
Treaties of Latvia
Treaties of Lebanon
Treaties of Lesotho
Treaties of Liberia
Treaties of the Kingdom of Libya
Treaties of Lithuania
Treaties of Luxembourg
Treaties of North Macedonia
Treaties of Madagascar
Treaties of Malawi
Treaties of Malaysia
Treaties of the Maldives
Treaties of Mali
Treaties of Malta
Treaties of Mauritania
Treaties of Mauritius
Treaties of Moldova
Treaties of the Mongolian People's Republic
Treaties of Montenegro
Treaties of Morocco
Treaties of Mozambique
Treaties of Namibia
Treaties of Nepal
Treaties of the Netherlands
Treaties of New Zealand
Treaties of Nicaragua
Treaties of Niger
Treaties of Nigeria
Treaties of Norway
Treaties of the Dominion of Pakistan
Treaties of Panama
Treaties of Papua New Guinea
Treaties of Paraguay
Treaties of Peru
Treaties of the Philippines
Treaties of the Polish People's Republic
Treaties of the Estado Novo (Portugal)
Treaties of the Socialist Republic of Romania
Treaties of Rwanda
Treaties of Saint Kitts and Nevis
Treaties of Saint Lucia
Treaties of Saint Vincent and the Grenadines
Treaties of Samoa
Treaties of San Marino
Treaties of São Tomé and Príncipe
Treaties of Senegal
Treaties of Serbia and Montenegro
Treaties of Seychelles
Treaties of Sierra Leone
Treaties of Singapore
Treaties of Slovakia
Treaties of Slovenia
Treaties of the Solomon Islands
Treaties of Somalia
Treaties of South Africa
Treaties of South Sudan
Treaties of the Soviet Union
Treaties of Spain
Treaties of Sri Lanka
Treaties of the Republic of the Sudan (1956–1969)
Treaties of Suriname
Treaties of Eswatini
Treaties of Sweden
Treaties of Switzerland
Treaties of the Syrian Republic (1930–1963)
Treaties of Tajikistan
Treaties of Togo
Treaties of Trinidad and Tobago
Treaties of Tunisia
Treaties of Turkey
Treaties of Turkmenistan
Treaties of Uganda
Treaties of the Ukrainian Soviet Socialist Republic
Treaties of the United Kingdom
Treaties of Uruguay
Treaties of Uzbekistan
Treaties of Vanuatu
Treaties of Venezuela
Treaties of Vietnam
Treaties of South Yemen
Treaties of Yugoslavia
Treaties of Zambia
Treaties of Zimbabwe
Treaties of East Germany
Treaties of Tanganyika
Treaties extended to the Territory of Papua and New Guinea
Treaties extended to Norfolk Island
Treaties extended to the Faroe Islands
Treaties extended to French Guiana
Treaties extended to Guadeloupe
Treaties extended to Martinique
Treaties extended to Réunion
Treaties extended to the Colony of Aden
Treaties extended to the Colony of the Bahamas
Treaties extended to the West Indies Federation
Treaties extended to British Honduras
Treaties extended to Bermuda
Treaties extended to the Colony of North Borneo
Treaties extended to the British Virgin Islands
Treaties extended to Brunei (protectorate)
Treaties extended to the Falkland Islands
Treaties extended to the Colony of Fiji
Treaties extended to the Gambia Colony and Protectorate
Treaties extended to Gibraltar
Treaties extended to Guernsey
Treaties extended to British Guiana
Treaties extended to Jersey
Treaties extended to British Kenya
Treaties extended to the Gilbert and Ellice Islands
Treaties extended to the Federation of Rhodesia and Nyasaland
Treaties extended to Basutoland
Treaties extended to the Crown Colony of Malta
Treaties extended to the Isle of Man
Treaties extended to British Mauritius
Treaties extended to the Colony and Protectorate of Nigeria
Treaties extended to Saint Helena, Ascension and Tristan da Cunha
Treaties extended to the Colony of Sarawak
Treaties extended to the Colony of Sierra Leone
Treaties extended to the Crown Colony of Singapore
Treaties extended to Swaziland (protectorate)
Treaties extended to Tanganyika (territory)
Treaties extended to the Uganda Protectorate
Treaties extended to Northern Rhodesia
Treaties extended to the Sultanate of Zanzibar
Treaties extended to the Aden Protectorate
Treaties extended to Greenland
Treaties extended to French Somaliland
Treaties extended to French Polynesia
Treaties extended to New Caledonia
Treaties extended to Saint Pierre and Miquelon
Treaties extended to British Hong Kong
1949 in labor relations